Molly DeWolf Swenson is an American entrepreneur, musician and Emmy-winning film producer. She is best known for being a co-founder of LA-based media company RYOT, which was acquired in 2016 by HuffPost / AOL (now Oath, Inc, a subsidiary of Verizon), a venture capitalist at LA-based technology fund 3Rodeo and a contestant on Season 10 of American Idol while she was interning at The White House under President Barack Obama.

Personal life 
DeWolf Swenson was born in Seattle, Washington to a doctor mother and a dancer father. She attended public high school Garfield High School and then Harvard, where she graduated in 2010.

Career 
While at the White House, she auditioned for American Idol, where she was considered an early top contender. After American Idol, she was hired by Global Philanthropy Group where she worked with Shakira, Kobe Bryant and Ben Stiller on philanthropic strategy. She met Bryn Mooser and David Darg and co-founded RYOT in 2012 in a garage in Venice. After pivoting into documentary, virtual reality and 360 video production, RYOT was acquired by HuffPost / AOL in April 2016 for around $15 million.

DeWolf Swenson was a Forbes 30 Under 30 list maker in 2017 and a producer on the Emmy-winning, Oscar-nominated documentary short Body Team 12, now on HBO.

Variety announced that DeWolf Swenson was leaving RYOT at the end of 2017. The publication also broke the news in March 2018 that she was tapped by Guy Oseary to join Live Nation's Maverick as its first-ever "Chief Impact Officer." In July, 2018 she worked with artist G-Eazy to launch his first nonprofit initiative, Endless Summer Fund.

DeWolf Swenson is credited with bringing the social texting app Community to Oseary in 2019 while working with him at Maverick.

Filmography

Music 
Known by the stage name Molly DeWolf, she auditioned in Milwaukee in 2010 for Season 10 of American Idol, making it through Hollywood Week to the final Las Vegas round.

On December 8, 2017, she opened for Kimbra in Los Angeles and released a single from her debut album, 8 Seconds.

References

Living people
American film producers
Harvard University alumni
Year of birth missing (living people)